Amelia County is a county located just southwest of Richmond in the Commonwealth of Virginia, United States. The county is located in Central Virginia and is included in the Greater Richmond Region. Its county seat is Amelia Court House.

Amelia County was created in 1735 from parts of Prince George and Brunswick counties, and was named in honor of Princess Amelia of Great Britain. Parts of the county were later carved out to create Prince Edward and Nottoway counties.

As of the 2020 census, the county population was 13,265.

History

Amelia County was created by legislative act in 1734 and 1735 from parts of Prince George and Brunswick counties. The county is named for Princess Amelia of Great Britain, daughter of King George II. As was customary, Amelia County was reduced by the division of territory to form newer counties as the population increased in the region; in 1754, Prince Edward County was formed from parts of Amelia County, and in 1789, Nottoway County was formed. The area was developed for plantation agriculture dependent on slave labor.

During the Civil War, Confederate general Robert E. Lee and his army spent April 4 and 5, 1865, at Amelia Court House before his surrender on April 9 to General Ulysses S. Grant at Appomattox. The last major battle of his army was fought at Sayler's Creek, on the border of Amelia and Prince Edward counties, on April 6.

Amelia is known for its minerals, including the nation's best supply of amazonite, a green feldspar found at the Morefield mine. In the 19th century, spas were developed around its mineral springs, which were destinations for travelers.

In 1986 the Amelia County Fair sponsored a competition for the world's largest potato pancake (with apple sauce). It was constructed to raise money that year for the German American National Scholarship Fund. The pancake weighed more than two and one-quarter tons and used four truckloads of potatoes.

Geography

Amelia County lies in the Piedmont region of Virginia, known for rolling hills and small ridges that lie between the Blue Ridge Mountains and Coastal Plain of Virginia. The county is bordered by the Appomattox River to the north and west, and Namozine Creek to the east.

Amelia County is drained by tributaries of the Appomattox.

Adjacent counties
Powhatan County - north
Chesterfield County - east
Dinwiddie County - southeast
Nottoway County - south
Prince Edward County - southwest
Cumberland County - west

Transportation

Air 

 Richmond International Airport is located 51 miles (82 km) northeast of Amelia County.

US Highways 
 (Patrick Henry Highway. Eastbound to Richmond. Westbound to Burkeville and Danville.)

State Routes 
 (In Amelia Court House: Virginia Street, Court Street, Washington Street, Church Street, Five Forks Road. In Amelia County: N. Five Forks Road, to SR 153.)
 (Military Road. To  and Blackstone.)
 (Holly Farms Road. To  and Farmville.)

Secondary Routes 
 (Chula Rd and Genito Rd. To Powhatan and Chesterfield Counties.)
 (Grub Hill Church Rd and Royalton Rd. To  and Powhatan Court House.)
 (Dennisville Rd. To Blackstone.)
 (Genito Rd. Serves the northwest and southwest area of Amelia County. To SR 307 near Rice.)

Rail 

 Norfolk Southern - freight rail service

Demographics

2020 census

Note: the US Census treats Hispanic/Latino as an ethnic category. This table excludes Latinos from the racial categories and assigns them to a separate category. Hispanics/Latinos can be of any race.

2000 Census
As of the census of 2000, there were 11,400 people, 4,240 households, and 3,175 families residing in the county. The population density was 32 people per square mile (12/km2). There were 4,609 housing units, at an average density of 13 per square mile (5/km2). The racial makeup of the county was 70.57% White, 28.05% Black or African American, 0.28% Native American, 0.17% Asian, 0.02% Pacific Islander, 0.25% from other races, and 0.67% from two or more races. 0.80% of the population were Hispanic or Latino of any race.

There were 4,240 households, of which 32.80% had children under the age of 18 living with them, 59.10% were married couples living together, 11.40% had a female householder with no husband present, and 25.10% were non-families. 20.70% of all households were made up of individuals, and 8.10% had someone living alone who was 65 years of age or older. The average household size was 2.66 and the average family size was 3.07.

The median age was 38 years, with 25.30% under 18, 6.70% from 18 to 24, 29.20% from 25 to 44, 25.40% from 45 to 64, and 13.30% who were 65 years of age or older. For every 100 females, there were 97.30 males. For every 100 females age 18 and over, there were 94.20 males.

The median household income was $40,252, and the median family income was $47,157. Males had a median income of $32,315, versus $23,102 for females. The per capita income for the county was $18,858. 8.40% of the population and 6.70% of families were below the poverty line. Out of the total people living in poverty, 7.10% were under the age of 18 and 11.70% were 65 or older.

Culture

Seasonal Events 

 A countywide festival called Amelia Day is held each May on the Saturday before Mother's Day in Amelia Court House. The festival started in the 1980s to celebrate the town's founding. Vendors, local clubs, and citizens organize to enjoy music, dancing, and socializing. At the first Amelia Day in 1985, residents signed a long roll that, along with other items, was put in a time capsule and buried in the courthouse green near the Confederate War Memorial. The capsule is scheduled to be opened in 2035.

 The Amelia County Fair is held in late summer or early fall each year at the Joe Paulette Memorial Park in Amelia Court House.

 Each October, the Amelia Frightfest, a trail haunt, opens at Tom Scott Park in Amelia Court House.

 Every year from April to October, on the second Saturday of every month, The Time Bandits car club hosts a car show at the Truist Bank parking lot on Patrick Henry Highway.

Attractions 

 Sayler's Creek Battlefield State Park
 Lake Chesdin
 Amelia Wildlife Management Area
 Amelia Country Club

Government

Board of Supervisors
District 1: David M. Felts Jr. (Chairman)
District 2: Dexter Jones
District 3: Shaun Weyant, Vice Chairman (I)
District 4: H. Joseph Easter IV, Chairman (I)
District 5: Todd Robinson

Constitutional officers
Clerk of the Circuit Court: Marilyn L. Wilson (D)
Commissioner of the Revenue: Laura Walsh (I)
Commonwealth's Attorney: Lee R. Harrison (I)
Sheriff: Rick Walker (I)
Treasurer: Stephanie Coleman (I)

Amelia County is represented by Republican Amanda Chase in the Virginia Senate, Republican Thomas C. Wright Jr. in the Virginia House of Delegates, and Democrat Abigail Spanberger in the U.S. House of Representatives.

Media
The Amelia Bulletin Monitor, a weekly newspaper, has covered the county since 1973.

Education

Public Primary and secondary schools 
Amelia County is served by the Amelia County School District.

 Amelia County High School 
 Amelia County Middle School
 Amelia County Elementary School

Private Primary and secondary Schools 

 Amelia Academy

Communities
There are no incorporated communities in Amelia County.

Census-designated places 

 Amelia Court House

Unincorporated communities 

 Ammon
 Chula
 Clementown Mills
 Coverly
 Deatonville
 Denaro
 Earls
 Fieldstown
 Giles Mill
 Gills
 Haw Branch
 Jetersville
 Little Patrick
 Lodore
 Mannboro
 Maplewood
 Masons Corner
 Mattoax
 Morven
 Namozine
 Otterburn
 Paineville
 Pontons/Ponton's Store
 Rodophil
 Scotts Fork
 Truxillo
 Whites Store
 Winterham

Historic sites 

The following sites in Amelia County are listed on the National Register of Historic Places:

 Barrett-Chumney House
 Dykeland
 Egglestetton
 Farmer House
 Haw Branch
 Ingleside
 St. John's Church (Grub Hill Church)
 Sayler's Creek Battlefield
 Wigwam
 Winterham Plantation

Notable residents 
William S. Archer, born in Amelia County, United States Senator from Virginia
Van T. Barfoot (1919-2012), U.S. Army Colonel and a U.S. Congressional Medal of Honor Recipient
William Wyatt Bibb, born in Amelia County, United States Senator from Georgia and first Governor of Alabama
Jesse Bragg, Negro-league baseball player
William Cocke (1747–1828), born in Amelia County, first United States Senator from Tennessee
Henry William Connor (1793–1866), born near Amelia Court House, elected United States Congressman from North Carolina
David Fanning, (1755–1825), born in Amelia County. A Loyalist officer during the American Revolutionary War, he captured Thomas Burke, a court-martial judge and Governor of North Carolina. One of only three individuals excluded from the amnesty after the Revolutionary War, Fanning moved to New Brunswick in present-day Canada for resettlement.
William Branch Giles, (1762–1830), born in Amelia County. Planter, United States Congressman, United States Senator, and Governor of Virginia
Edmund Harrison (1764–1826), Speaker of the Virginia House of Delegates (1802–1803)
John Winston Jones, (1791–1848), born in Amelia County. Speaker of the United States House of Representatives
Nellie A. Ramsey Leslie (c.1840s-c.1920s), born into slavery in Amelia County. She became a noted musician, teacher and composer, founding a musical conservatory in Corpus Christi, Texas.
Robert Russa Moton (1867–1940), noted African American educator. He was born in Amelia County but was raised in Rice in nearby Prince Edward County, Virginia.
Mary Virginia Terhune (1830-1922), born in Amelia County. A prolific and bestselling author in both fiction and non-fiction, the first woman elected to the Virginia Historical Society

References

External links
 https://va-ameliacounty.civicplus.com/ - Official Amelia County Government website
 https://web.archive.org/web/20191115180811/http://ameliabusinessdirectory.com/ - Amelia Business Directory
 Amelia Co. Christmas 1784
 The Amelia Bulletin Monitor - Amelia County's newspaper
 http://www.ameliadayfestival.com/ - Amelia Day website
 https://ameliacountyfair.com/ - Amelia County Fair website

 
Virginia counties
Populated places established in 1735
1735 establishments in the Thirteen Colonies